Manfred III (died 1244) was the third Marquess of Saluzzo, from 1215 to his death. He was the son of Boniface of Saluzzo and Maria di Torres of Sassari (in Sardinia). Since his father died in 1212, he succeeded his grandfather Manfred II as marquess on the latter's death in 1215. His paternal grandmother Azalaïs or Adelasia of Montferrat was regent during his minority until 1218. During that period, his grandmother paid tribute to Count Thomas I of Savoy.

Manfred fought the expansionistic policies of Thomas, as had his father, and he defended the borders of his march with care. He died in 1244 and was succeeded by his son Thomas.

He married in March 1233 to Beatrice, daughter of Amadeus IV, Count of Savoy. The couple had the following children:
 Alésia (c. 1236 – before 12 Jul 1311); married Edmund de Lacy, Baron of Pontefract and had issue
 Thomas I, Marquess of Saluzzo (1239–1296); succeeded Manfred as Marquess of Saluzzo.
 Agnes (1245 – after 4 August 1265); born posthumously, married John, son of Eustace de Vesci, no issue.
 Margaret (born 1245); born posthumously, twin of Agnes.

References

Sources

1244 deaths
Manfred 3
Aleramici
Year of birth unknown